The Orthodox Diocese of San Giulio is an Eastern Orthodox jurisdiction; it claims to have been originally established in 1995 by the Ukrainian Orthodox Church – Kyiv Patriarchate before its amalgamation in 2018 to form the Orthodox Church of Ukraine.

References

External links 
 Official website of the Diocese of San Giulio

Eastern Orthodox Church bodies in Europe